The Azerbaijan Liberal Party is a liberal political party in Azerbaijan.

It was founded on 3 June 1995 by the former Secretary of State of Azerbaijan Lala Shevket on the Constituent Conference held in the town of Barda in the unoccupied part of Qarabagh region of Azerbaijan. It was registered with the Azerbaijani Ministry of Justice on 15 August 1995.

ALP declares its main purpose to be the construction of a legal state with socially orientated liberal economy, parliamentary democracy and with the clear division of powers between the branches of government, guaranteeing equality of everyone before the law.

The supreme governing body of ALP is its Congress. The main everyday working organs are the Political Council, Executive Committee, and the Central Revision Committee.

The founder of the Liberal Party of Azerbaijan and its leader is the doctor of medicine and philosophy, professor Lala Shevket, who has been elected to the position of party chairman at the party’s Constituent Conference on 3 June 1995. In June 2003 she has resigned from her position prior to the Presidential elections, though the members of the Liberal Party still consider her their spiritual and moral leader, the position being confirmed by the ALP III Congress on 7 June 2003.

At the last election (November 5, 2000 and January 7, 2001), the party won 1.3% of the popular vote and zero out of 125 seats, according to the official results of the Central Election Commission.

The incumbent Chairman of ALP is the former head of the ALP Executive Committee Avaz Temirkhan< who has been elected to this position on 12 September 2010 at the Party Congress.
The incumbent Chairman of the Executive Committee is Elman Mammadzade.

See also
Liberalism
Contributions to liberal theory
Liberalism worldwide
List of liberal parties
Liberal democracy

1995 establishments in Azerbaijan
Azerbaijani democracy movements
Liberal parties in Azerbaijan
Political parties established in 1995
Political parties in Azerbaijan